The 2011 Castle Point Borough Council election took place on 5 May 2011 to elect members of Castle Point Borough Council in Essex, England. One third of the council was up for election and the Conservative party stayed in overall control of the council.

After the election, the composition of the council was
Conservative 25
Canvey Island Independent Party 16

Election result
No seats changed hands at the election, with every councillor standing again being re-elected.

Ward results

References

Castle Point Borough Council elections
2011 English local elections
2010s in Essex